Behrn Arena is an indoor ice hockey arena located in Örebro, Sweden. It is Örebro HK's home arena. The arena opened on 1 January 1965 and previously had a capacity of 4,400 spectators, but after a renovation that began in 2010 and finished in September 2011, this number increased to 5,200. The finished renovation of the arena was inaugurated on 28 September 2011. The current capacity is 5,500.

By Easter 1967, the Rolling Stones performed two concerts inside.

References 

Indoor ice hockey venues in Sweden
Sport in Örebro
Buildings and structures in Örebro
Sports venues completed in 1965
1965 establishments in Sweden